Timothy Douglas "Tim" Moffitt is a Republican member of the North Carolina House of Representatives who has represented the 117th district (based in Henderson County) since 2020. Moffitt previously represented the 116th district (based in Buncombe County) from 2011 until 2015, following his 2014 defeat to Democrat Brian Turner.

Electoral history

2022

2020

2014

2012

2010

2008

Committee assignments

2021-2022
Finance
Health
Local Government - Land Use, Planning and Development 
Regulatory Reform - Vice Chair
Alcoholic Beverage Control - Chair
Transportation

2013-2014
Commerce and Job Development - Vice Chair
Finance
Government
Rules, Calendar, and Operations of the House
State Personnel - Vice Chair
Transportation

2011-2012
Commerce and Job Development - Vice Chair
Finance
Government
Rules, Calendar, and Operations of the House
State Personnel 
Transportation

References

External links
Campaign Website

|-

|-

Living people
Democratic Party members of the North Carolina House of Representatives
21st-century American politicians
People from Hendersonville, North Carolina
Year of birth missing (living people)